Yates & Thom Ltd, or Yates of Blackburn, was a British manufacturer of stationary steam engines and boilers at the Canal Ironworks, Blackburn, Lancashire, England.

The company had its origins in a blacksmith's shop started by William Yates in 1824.

In the 1860s, the company supplied a cam operated, drop valve compound engine operating at 100psi to the India Mill, Darwen. Other mills supplied by Yates and Thom included the Durban Mill, Oldham. This was  1800 hp triple-expansion four-cylinder engine built in 1906. It had a 24"HP, 29"IP, two 38"LP cylinders with a 5 ft 6" stroke. At 180psi, it drove a. 27 ft, 67 ton flywheel with 38 ropes, at 65 rpm.  It used Corliss valves on all cylinders. An engine, one of a pair, supplied by the firm survives at Leigh Spinners.

The company supplied a 3,300 horse power twin tandem compound engine which survives in the engine house at the Astley Green Colliery Museum which was the largest steam winding engine used on the Lancashire Coalfield.

In 1928, the company became Foster, Yates and Thom when it was acquired by Joseph Foster & Sons. The company continued to manufacture boilers until 1964, with the remainder of the works closing in 1973.

References
Notes

Bibliography

External links

Foster Yates and Thom on the Cottontown site

Steam engine manufacturers
Textile machinery manufacturers
Companies based in Blackburn
Defunct engineering companies of the United Kingdom